Resh Marhatta (Nepali: / हिन्दी : रेश मराठा) is an Asian/American actor and filmmaker.  Resh is also an author, columnist and a business educator. Resh has received a business teaching license from Utah State Board of Education. He is a graduate from Weber State University with high honor (Phi Kappa Phi Honor Society)  Getting a presidential scholarship and registering his name on who’s who book among American universities and colleges sums up his academic excellency. He was elected as a Student Body Officer (Senator) in Weber State University. He made his acting debut with a supporting role in the Finish TV series called Junketeers directed by Timu during his California days back in 2001. He did his first modeling assignment with Artistic Imaging LLC, photographed by Jason Montgomery in Salt Lake City, Utah.

Marhatta travels around the world as a motivational speaker for youth empowerment. He is frequently seen judging for beauty pageants and other reality shows in countries like Singapore, Bangladesh, Nepal, India, and Thailand. He was honored as an Asian Youth Icon 2015, in Singapore by the King of Medan (Indonesia) Raja Gontar organized by Tan Beverly, Orchid Country Club, Grand Ballroom, Singapor  e. Marhatta also received doctor of letters from Kings University, on 30 May 2016 for his achievements at Hilton Convention Center at Hilton Hotel, Baltimore, Maryland.

Marhatta is been writing columns in magazines of Nepal, Vibes and Food & Wine regarding health and fitness. He has written three novels  Roots (one of the untold stories of Asia), 11th Street (Romantic Thriller) and T2V, Trip to Vegas (Suspense Thriller). Trip to Vegas  was released among the panel of intellects, Pevannan Kuppusamy, Selvi Kuman, Carolin Praba,  Unni Sivaraman and Tamil/ Indian actor Rkay. in an event held in Baltimore in 2016.

Family 
Resh Marhatta belongs to family of  Parashar Gotri Maratha immigrants into Gorkha Kingdom from Maharashtra, later moved to Jhamsikhel, Lalitpur then to the US. His father is Shakti Marhatta, who served as an economist in the Finance Ministry of Nepal and was one of the key bureaucrats while designing and implementing value towards modernizing and reforming revenue administration of Nepal and  his mother is Bina Marhatta, a housewife. Resh is the youngest of six siblings. He went to MAV Boarding School in early days.

Acting career
Resh Marhatta started acting career with Junkeeters (Finnish ) and Bollywood movie “Dus” starring Salman Khan, Sanjay Dutt directed by Late Mukal Anand but due to director's unexpected death, movie Dus did not release. His first two Kollywood movies (simultaneously) “Pinjada” and “Chahanchu Ma Timilainai” were a massive hit at the box-office during his freshman year in college. After graduation, he has played some movies like “Kathmandu”, “Mission Paisa-Reloaded 2”, “Mero Best Friend”, “Acceptance”, “Mero Jiwan Sathi” etc. He was appreciated in movies like “Mero Best Friend”, “Mero Jiwan Sathi”. His short movie “Acceptance” was able to make a mark in some international film festivals. Resh is seen in many TVCs, endorsements like Apartments and Housing, Insurance, Australian Wines, Tea, Biscuits, Clothing, Paints, Oil, etc.

Resh has acted in dozens of music videos  amongst which “Yo prasanga” by Yama Buddha, “Pagal Paagal” by Samil Merchant and “Pagalpan” by Yama Buddha were much appreciated. He is producing NATIONAL TREASURE, the blood run which is set to release worldwide. His upcoming movies “Paranormal World” (Bollywood), The Moon Virtue Culture Media’s next venture (Chinese) along with his own production “National Treasure” are on hold due to Pandemic.

Film

Filmography

Upcoming films

TVCs / endorsements

Music videos

Other works
Resh travels around the world as a motivational speaker for youth empowerment. He is seen judging for beauty pageants and other reality shows in countries like Singapore, Bangladesh, Nepal, India, Thailand and so forth. He is also a columnist and has written columns in Popular magazine “Food and Wine- hospitality “and “Vibes-lifestyle “in the segment “workout with Resh” from 2015-2019. Resh has also invested some properties in Florida and Nepal.

Awards and recognitions

 Who’s Who Amongst American Colleges and Universities Excellence Award 1997-98, United States
 Asia Youth Icon by Raja Gotar 2015-2016, Singapore
 Honorary Doctorate, Kings University 2016, United States
 Grand Achievers 2016, USA

Filmy career
He is producing NATIONAL TREASURE, the blood run which is set to release worldwide.

External links
Official Website

American people of Nepalese descent
21st-century Nepalese male actors
Living people
Nepalese male film actors
Year of birth missing (living people)